Glaslyn was a rural district in the administrative county of Caernarfonshire from 1894 to 1934.

The district was formed under the Local Government Act 1894  from the part of Festiniog Rural Sanitary District in Caernarfonshire. The district was named after Glaslyn, a lake at the centre of the area.

The district contained three civil parishes:
Beddgelert 			
Dolbenmaen 
Treflys 

The rural district was abolished by a County Review Order in 1934. Beddgelert passed to Gwyrfai Rural District, and Dolbenmaen to Llŷn Rural District. Treflys parish was abolished, most of it becoming part of Dolbenmaen parish, with parts going to the urban districts of Criccieth and Porthmadog.

Sources
Census of England and Wales: County Report for Carnarvonshire, 1901, 1911, 1921
Census of England and Wales: County Report for Caernarvonshire 1931
Caernarvonshire Administrative County (Vision of Britain)

Caernarfonshire
Rural districts of Wales